Vanderhorstia mertensi, Mertens' shrimp goby or the slender shrimp goby, is a ray-finned fish species native to the Red Sea, Japan, Papua-New Guinea and the Great Barrier Reef. Male individuals can reach a length of 11 cm in total. In 2008 a first specimen was collected in the Mediterranean Sea, in the Gulf of Fethiye, southern Turkey, where it was found on sandy bottoms in the vicinity of beds of sea grass. It is now common in Israel, Turkey and Greece.  According to the Mediterranean Science Commission this species most likely entered the Mediterranean via the Suez Canal from the Red Sea.

 The specific name honours the German herpetologist Robert Mertens (1894-1975), the former director of the Naturmuseum Senckenberg in Frankfurt, from whom the author, Klausewitz, learnt about the biological and ecological view of modern systematics and taxonomy.

References

Gobiidae
Taxa named by Wolfgang Klausewitz
Fish described in 1974